Stilbosis placatrix is a moth in the family Cosmopterigidae. It was described by Ronald W. Hodges in 1969. It is found in North America, where it has been recorded from Arkansas, Maryland and Illinois.

The wingspan is about 7 mm. Adults have been recorded on wing from May to July.

References

Moths described in 1969
Chrysopeleiinae
Moths of North America